Eicochrysops hippocrates, the white-tipped blue, is a butterfly of the family Lycaenidae. It is found in Africa, south of the Sahara, including Madagascar. In South Africa it is found from the East Cape along the KwaZulu-Natal coast to Eswatini, Mpumalanga and the Limpopo province.

The wingspan is 18–23 mm for males and 20–24 mm for females. Adults are on wing from September to November and from January to June. There are two generations per year.

The larvae feed on Polygonum and Rumex species.

References

Butterflies described in 1793
Eicochrysops